Laurent Sarr (born 1943) is a Senegalese athlete. He competed in the men's long jump at the 1968 Summer Olympics.

References

1943 births
Living people
Athletes (track and field) at the 1968 Summer Olympics
Senegalese male long jumpers
Olympic athletes of Senegal
Place of birth missing (living people)
African Games medalists in athletics (track and field)
African Games bronze medalists for Senegal
Athletes (track and field) at the 1965 All-Africa Games